Gahnia lanigera, also known as the black grass saw-sedge, desert saw-sedge or little saw-sedge , is a species of flowering plant in the sedge family that is found in southern Australia. The specific epithet lanigera means 'woolly'.

Description
The plant is a rhizomatous, tufted perennial sedge growing up to 45 cm high and 2 m wide, with stiff, narrow, sharp-pointed leaves. The flowers are brown. It is a favoured food plant of Antipodia atralba, the black and white skipper butterfly.

Distribution and habitat
The species occurs in arid parts of southern Western Australia, South Australia, north-western Victoria and western New South Wales where it is found on sandy soils in mallee woodland and heathland, as well as on clayey or granitic loams and coastal dunes.

References

 

 
lanigera
Flora of Western Australia
Endemic flora of Australia
Flora of South Australia
Flora of Victoria (Australia)
Flora of New South Wales
Plants described in 1810
Poales of Australia